Thomas William Worsdell (14 January 1838 – 28 June 1916) was an English locomotive engineer.  He was born in Liverpool into a Quaker family.

Family
T. W. Worsdell – normally known as William – was the eldest son of Nathaniel Worsdell (1809–1886), and grandson of the coachbuilder Thomas Clarke Worsdell (1788–1862). His younger brother, Wilson Worsdell (1850–1920), was also a locomotive engineer. T. C. Worsdell had become a Quaker at some point between 1812 and 1816, and his descendants, including Nathaniel, William and Wilson, were brought up in the Quaker faith.

William was born at his parents' house in Liverpool on 14 January 1838. He began school at the age of two, and in 1847 was sent as a boarder to Ackworth, a Quaker school in Yorkshire, where he remained until 1852.

Career
He worked at the Crewe Works of the LNWR under John Ramsbottom but in 1865 moved to the United States to the Pennsylvania Railroad.  In 1871 he was invited by Francis William Webb to return to Crewe.  In 1881 he was appointed locomotive superintendent of the Great Eastern Railway, but in 1885 moved to the North Eastern Railway, being replaced at the GER by James Holden.  He retired from the NER on 1 October 1890 due to ill health and was replaced by his younger brother Wilson Worsdell.

He died in Arnside on 28 June 1916.

Locomotive Designs
GER Class G14 2-4-0
GER Class Y14 (LNER Class J15 0-6-0)
GER Class G15 (LNER Class Y6 0-4-0Tram)
GER Class M15 (LNER Class F4 2-4-2T)

Patents
Worsdell obtained a number of patents including several (in association with August von Borries, a Prussian locomotive engineer) relating to compound locomotives.  T. W. Worsdell used the von Borries two-cylinder compound system in several of his designs for the North Eastern Railway.

Worsdell-von Borries patents
 GB190006487, published 16 February 1901, An improvement in starting valves for compound steam engines
 GB190022906, published 2 November 1901, Improvements in valves for use in compound locomotives and other compound engines
 US803981 (with Herbert Richard Lapage), published 7 November 1905, Compound locomotive

References

External links
 T.W.Worsdell at www.lner.info
 Joseph Armstrong. his son & William Dean at www.steamindex.com
 

1838 births
1916 deaths
Engineers from Liverpool
English Quakers
People educated at Ackworth School
Locomotive builders and designers
Locomotive superintendents
English railway mechanical engineers
Great Eastern Railway people
North Eastern Railway (UK) people